Uganda sent a delegation to compete at the 1996 Summer Paralympics in Atlanta, United States. The country thus made its return to the Summer Paralympic Games after a twenty-year absence. It entered only one athlete, who competed in powerlifting. He did not win a medal.

Powerlifting 

Richard Bogere, Uganda's only representative, competed in the 67.5 kg event. He finished 21st (last of those who completed the event), with a lifted weight of 110 kg.

See also
 Uganda at the 1996 Summer Olympics

References

External links
International Paralympic Committee official website

Nations at the 1996 Summer Paralympics
1996
Paralympics